This list of Dell ownership activities delineates mergers, acquisitions, divestitures, and stakes of Dell.

Acquisitions and mergers

Stakes

Divestitures

Notes

References

Dell
 01
Dell